CTS Education, Sports and Culture is a free-to-air television station in Taiwan, operated by Chinese Television System (CTS). The channel mainly broadcasts documentaries, arts and cultural programming, archival programming from the CTS library, and live sports coverage.

See also
 Media of Taiwan

Television stations in Taiwan
Television channels and stations established in 1972
Taiwan Broadcasting System
1972 establishments in Taiwan
Educational and instructional television channels